Fayçal El-Khoury  (born May 15, 1955) is a Canadian Liberal politician of Lebanese descent, who was elected to represent the riding of Laval—Les Îles in the House of Commons of Canada in the 2015 federal election, El-Khoury won with 47.7% of the vote. He holds an engineering degree from Concordia University. El-Khoury immigrated to Canada from Lebanon in 1976.

Electoral record

References

External links
 Official Website

 

1955 births
Living people
Canadian consultants
Canadian engineers
Canadian politicians of Lebanese descent
Concordia University alumni
Lebanese emigrants to Canada
Liberal Party of Canada MPs
Members of the House of Commons of Canada from Quebec
Politicians from Laval, Quebec
21st-century Canadian politicians